HMS Sealion (S07) was a Porpoise-class submarine.

Design and construction
The Porpoise class was the first class of operational submarines built for the Royal Navy after the end of the Second World War, and were designed to take advantage of experience gained by studying German Type XXI U-boats and British wartime experiments with the submarine , which was modified by streamlining and fitting a bigger battery.

Displacement was  standard and  full load surfaced and  submerged. Eight  torpedo tubes were fitted; six in the bow, and two in the stern. Up to 30 torpedoes could be carried, with the initial outfit consisting of the unguided Mark 8 and the homing Mark 20 torpedoes.

Sealion was laid down on 5 June 1958 by Cammell Laird at their Birkenhead shipyard. She was launched on 31 December 1959, and completed on 25 July 1961, being assigned the Pennant number S 07.

Service
In 1963 Sealion was carrying out surveillance operations against a Soviet naval exercise when she was detected by Soviet warships and forced to surface. Between 1976 and 1977 she was commanded by J K Boyle. Sealion attended the 1977 Silver Jubilee Fleet Review off Spithead when she was part of the Submarine Flotilla.

In late 1986–1987 Sealion was deployed to the South Atlantic, carrying out patrols from the Falkland Islands before visiting Chile and returning to Britain via the Caribbean. Upon her return, Sealion returned flying a Jolly Roger, a traditional act of Royal Navy submarines after a kill, suggesting that she was involved in a special forces related operation. She was paid off in December 1987 and sold to an Education Trust for deprived inner-city youngsters "Inter Action", arriving at Chatham on 22 June 1988.

She was broken up in 1990.

References

Publications

 

British Porpoise-class submarines
Ships built on the River Mersey
1959 ships